Hissop is a census-designated place and unincorporated community in Coosa County, Alabama, United States. Its population was 209 as of the 2020 census.

Demographics

2020 census

As of the 2020 United States census, there were 209 people, 203 households, and 80 families residing in the CDP.

History
A post office was established as Hissop in 1880, and remained in operation until it was discontinued in 1990. The community was named after the biblical plant Ezov, usually translated as hyssop.

References

Census-designated places in Coosa County, Alabama
Census-designated places in Alabama